Terry Archer Welch was an American computer scientist. Along with Abraham Lempel and Jacob Ziv, he developed the lossless Lempel–Ziv–Welch (LZW) compression algorithm, which was published in 1984.

Education
Welch received a B.S., M.S. and Ph.D. degree at MIT in electrical engineering. He taught at the University of Texas at Austin and worked in computer design at Honeywell in Waltham, Massachusetts.

Career
He taught at the University of Texas in Austin until joining the Sperry Research Center, Sudbury, Massachusetts, in 1976 where the paper about the LZW algorithm was published. In 1983 he joined DEC where he worked as DEC liaison to MCC's advanced computer architecture program.

He died of a brain tumor in 1988.

References 

American information theorists
Modern cryptographers
1939 births
1988 deaths